The Jazz Bass V is the five string (extended-range) version of the Fender Jazz Bass.
It comes in several different versions, with active or passive pickups.

Standard Jazz Bass V
The Fender Standard Jazz Bass V has single coil pickups, and passive electronics. The neck has 20 frets and a 4+1 tuner configuration.

Deluxe Active Jazz Bass V
The Fender Deluxe Active Jazz Bass V is a member of the Deluxe series from Fender. The body is similar to the Standard Jazz Bass V.

Despite the variety of colors to choose from, every model comes with a 3-ply black pickguard.
The body is made of alder or ash, the neck of maple and the fingerboard rosewood or maple (since 2016).
Available colors are 3-Color Sunburst, Olympic White and Surf Pearl (as of 2016).
The neck has also 20 frets and a flat 12" radius as opposed to American Elite models which had 21 frets and a bound compound radius fingerboard with rectangular block inlays.

Pickups are two ceramic Vintage Noiseless with nickel-plated pole pieces connected in an S/S configuration. Models produced before 2004 came with Suhr-designed "single pole" stacked humbuckers.
It has four knobs; a master volume, a pickup blend pot, a 3-band equalizer powered by a pair of 9V batteries and an active/passive switch (since 2016).

American Deluxe Jazz Bass V

The American Deluxe Jazz Bass V, introduced in 1995, sported a downsized body shape and a 22-fret neck with the choice of rosewood, maple or pao ferro fretboard with abalone dot position markers, featuring the same specifications as the Deluxe Active Jazz Bass V. It was updated in 2004 with two Samarium Cobalt Noiseless pickups, 4+1 tuners and an 18V preamp. Fender redesigned this model in 2010.

J